José Borges (1882 – after 1909) was a Cuban baseball pitcher and second baseman in the Cuban League and Negro leagues. He played from 1902 to 1909 with several clubs, including Almendares, Nuevo Criollo and Club Fé, as well as competing in the Negro leagues for the Cuban Stars.

References
Citations

Sources

External links

1882 births
Cuban League players
Cuban baseball players
Cuban Stars (West) players
Club Fé players
Year of death unknown
Nuevo Criollo players